Eddie Dombrower (born 1957) is an American computer game and video game designer, programmer and producer.  He is best known as the co-creator of the baseball games Earl Weaver Baseball and Intellivision World Series Baseball. He is also recognized for designing the first dance notation computer software, DOM.

Dombrower studied both dance and mathematics at Pomona College in Claremont, California. After his graduation he found it frustrating that the new microcomputer technology had not solved an age-old problem: how choreographers could record their work in written form. He created the DOM system on an Apple II computer in 1981, which allowed choreographers to use a system of codes to enter their work. The resulting dance movements were then performed by a figure on screen.

In 1982, Intellivision game design director Don Daglow (also a Pomona College graduate) recruited Dombrower to join Mattel to work on a new type of baseball game that for the first time would feature large on-screen animated figures and multiple camera angles. Prior video games all showed a static or scrolling playfield from a single camera angle, and Daglow believed that Dombrower's experience with DOM would allow him to get the desired results. Dombrower made progress quickly, and Intellivision World Series Baseball's new design originated a campaign during the Christmas television advertising season in 1982. Although the title had limited distribution because of the video game crash of 1983, it proved that video games could mimic television coverage of sports events, and soon other sport games mimiqued Dombrower introduced with Intellivision World Series Baseball.

In 1986, Daglow, then working at Electronic Arts, sought out Dombrower once again. EA Founder Trip Hawkins had agreed to back the creation of another baseball game, Earl Weaver Baseball. As they had done at Intellivision, Daglow designed the baseball simulation and overall look, while Dombrower designed the game's visual presentation and its underlying technology. In contrast to some celebrity athletes who merely lent their names to projects, Hall of Fame manager Earl Weaver worked with the team to design the game's artificial intelligence by providing strategic knowledge about the game. When the game appeared in 1987, it was called one of the 25 best games of all time by Computer Gaming World, and its success helped pave the way for the creation of the EA Sports brand and product line. Dombrower also led the development of the sequel, Earl Weaver Baseball II.

Dombrower developed EWB Baseball for the iPhone, the spiritual successor to the Earl Weaver series, which was released March 23, 2009.

References

1957 births
Living people
American video game designers
Video game programmers
Intellivision
Pomona College alumni